Greenland is Cracker's seventh studio album. The first single was "Something You Ain't Got."

Track listing
All songs written by David Lowery, except for where noted.
 "Something You Ain't Got" (Rob McCutcheon, Zac Ray, Dwight Young)- 5:17
 "Maggie" - 3:43
 "Where Have Those Days Gone?" (Lowery, Matt Durant) - 4:12
 "Fluffy Lucy" - 3:24
 "The Riverside" - 4:21    
 "Gimme One More Chance" (Lowery, David Immerglück) - 4:14
 "I'm So Glad She Ain't Never Coming Back" (Lowery, Immerglück, Johnny Hickman) - 1:54
 "Sidi Ifni" (Lowery, Hickman) - 6:05
 "I Need Better Friends" - 3:49
 "Minotaur" - 4:27
 "Night Falls" (Lowery, Hickman) - 5:24
 "Better Times Are Coming Our Way" - 5:01
 "Everybody Gets One for Free" (Lowery, Hickman, Durant, Stephen Koester) - 6:43
 "Darling, We're Out of Time" (Lowery, Durant) - 4:36

Main Personnel

 David Lowery – vocals, guitars
 Johnny Hickman – guitars, vocals
 Frank Funaro – drums, percussion
 Kenny Margolis – keyboards, piano, accordion
 Victor Krummenacher – bass

References

2006 albums
Cracker (band) albums
Cooking Vinyl albums
Albums produced by David Lowery (musician)